Alaric the Goth: Fall of the Western Roman Empire is a 1980 board game published by Strategic Studies Games.

Gameplay
Alaric the Goth is a strategic level game that simulates of the fall of the Roman Empire to the attacking barbarians.

Reception
Richard A. Edwards reviewed Alaric the Goth in The Space Gamer No. 43. Edwards commented that "Alaric the Goth is fair history, a good game, and great fun."

References

Board games introduced in 1980